Wilton is a village in south Herefordshire, England just under a mile west of the market town of Ross-on-Wye.

In 1100, Henry I set up three royal manors in Herefordshire, including the manor of Wilton.  This included a number of surrounding villages such as  Peterstow.

Wilton Bridge  was a major crossing  of the River Wye and was protected by Wilton Castle . Both suffered significant damage during the English Civil War. The bridge has been restored and strengthened and updated with a sundial .

Now the village is known for the roundabout where the A49 trunk road joins the A40. Being a convenient staging point it has several hotels.

References

External links
 Wilton Castle Website
 WyeNot's description of Wilton Castle
 Landscape Origins of the Wye Valley (LOWV) project's page on Wilton
 Vaga Valley Publishing's page on Wilton Bridge
 Bridstow CE Primary School
 Wilton Court Hotel
 Bridge House Hotel
 Orles Barn Hotel
 Castle Lodge Hotel
 The White Lion Inn

External links

Villages in Herefordshire